First Rose of Spring is the 70th solo studio album by American singer-songwriter Willie Nelson.  It was released on July 3, 2020, by Legacy Recordings. The album was produced by Buddy Cannon. The album was originally scheduled to be released on April 24, but was pushed back to July 3 due to the COVID-19 pandemic.

Content
The album features eleven tracks. Nelson and Cannon co-wrote two originals for the album, while the remaining tracks include compositions by Chris Stapleton, Toby Keith and Pete Graves. The title track was written by Randy Houser, Allen Shamblin and Mack Vickery. The closing track of the album is a cover of Roy Clark's "Yesterday When I Was Young", originally written by Charles Aznavour as "Hier encore".

Critical reception

First Rose of Spring received positive review from music critics. At Metacritic, which assigns a normalized rating out of 100 to reviews from mainstream critics, the album received a score of 76 out of 100 based on six reviews, indicating "generally favorable reviews."

Peter J. Hoetjes from Glide Magazine praised the album's songwriting and use of organic instruments, saying that Nelson "willfully imbues First Rose of Spring with his own brand of bitter honesty, giving the album the sort of emotional resonance that the majority of his contemporary peers forgo in exchange for switchboard instrumentation and hollow lyricism." Writing for The Independent, Elisa Bray gave the album four out of five stars, describing it as "the work of an artist who will never grow old."

Commercial performance
First Rose of Spring debuted at No. 5 on Billboards Top Country Albums with 12,000 album equivalent units.

Track listing

Personnel
Adapted from the album liner notes.

Performance
Dave Angell – strings
Monisa Angell – strings
Jerry Bifano – strings
Buddy Cannon – acoustic guitar, background vocals
Melodie Cannon – background vocals
Chad Cromwell – drums
David Davidson – strings
Ward Davis – background vocals
Connie Ellisor – strings
Alicia Enstrom – strings
Kevin "Swine" Grantt – upright bass
Mike Johnson – steel guitar
Anthony La Marchina – strings
Catherine Marx – piano, B3 organ, Wurlitzer, Rhodes
Willie Nelson – Trigger, lead vocals
Larry Paxton – upright bass
Sari Reist – strings
Mickey Raphael – harmonica
Bobby Terry – electric guitar, acoustic guitar, steel guitar
Kristin Wilkinson – strings
Lonnie Wilson – drums
Karen Winkelmann – strings

Production
Luke Armentrout – mastering assistant
Kevin Boettger – assistant engineer
Buddy Cannon – production
Tony Castle – recording, mixing
Steve Chadie – recording
Andrew Darby – mastering assistant
Shannon Finnegan – production coordinator
Michelle Freetley – assistant engineer
Bobbi Giel – mastering assistant
Steven Lamb – copyist
Matt Leigh – assistant engineer
Steve Mazur – assistant engineer
Andrew Mendelson – mastering
Nick Molino – assistant engineer
Bryce Roberts – assistant engineer
Bobby Terry – additional engineer
Kristin Wilkinson – string arrangements

Other personnel
Alexandra Dascalu Nelson – back cover photo
Micah Nelson – artwork

Charts

References

Willie Nelson albums
2020 albums
Albums produced by Buddy Cannon
Legacy Recordings albums
Albums postponed due to the COVID-19 pandemic